This is the list of grand viziers (vazīr-e azam) of Safavid Iran.

List of grand viziers

Notes

References

Sources

Further reading
 

Government of Safavid Iran
Lists of office-holders
Lists of political office-holders in Iran

Safavid Iran